The Tanagra figurines were a mold-cast type of Greek terracotta figurines produced from the later fourth century BC, named after the Boeotian town of Tanagra, where many were excavated and which has given its name to the whole class. However, they were produced in many cities.  They were coated with a liquid white slip before firing and were sometimes painted afterward in naturalistic tints with watercolors, such as the famous "Dame en Bleu" ("Lady in Blue") at the Louvre. They were widely exported around the ancient Greek world. Such figures were made in many other Mediterranean sites, including Alexandria, Tarentum in Magna Graecia, Centuripe in Sicily and Myrina in Mysia.

Although not portraits, Tanagra figures depict real women—and some men and boys—in everyday costume, with familiar accessories like hats, wreaths or fans. Some character pieces may have represented stock figures from the New Comedy of Menander and other writers. Others continued an earlier tradition of molded terracotta figures used as cult images or votive objects. Typically they are about 10 to 20 centimetres high.

Some Tanagra figurines were religious in purpose, but most seem to have been entirely decorative, much like their modern equivalents from the 18th century onward. Given Greek burial customs, they were placed as grave goods in the tombs of their owners, very likely without any sense that they would serve the deceased in the afterlife, in the way that is common in the funerary art of ancient Egypt or China. They do not seem to have been specially made for burial.

The coraplasters, or sculptors of the models that provided the molds, delighted in revealing the body under the folds of a himation thrown round the shoulders like a cloak and covering the head, over a chiton, and the movements of such drapery in action.

Discovery and excavation

Tanagra was an unimportant city in antiquity. The city had come to the attention of historians and archeologists during the early 19th century after war broke out between the Turks and their allies, the British and the French, following a warning of a French invasion. Tanagra figures had not been much noted before the end of the 1860s, when ploughmen of Vratsi in Boeotia, Greece, began to uncover tombs ranging in date over many centuries. The main finds especially from the 4th and 3rd centuries BC were secured in 1874. Inside and outside the tombs of the Hellenistic period—3rd to 1st centuries BC—were many small terracotta figures. Great quantities found in excavation sites at Tanagra identified the city as the source of these figures, which were also exported to distant markets.

The figures appealed to 19th century middle-class ideals of realism, and "Tanagra figures" entered the visual repertory of Europeans. Jean-Léon Gérôme created a polychromatic sculpture depicting the spirit of Tanagra, and one French critic described the fashionable women portrayed in the statuettes as "the parisienne of the ancient world". Oscar Wilde, in his novel The Picture of Dorian Gray (1891), has Dorian liken his love, Sybil, to "the delicate grace of the Tanagra figurine that you have in your Studio, Basil." Later, in his play An Ideal Husband (1895), Wilde introduces the character of Mabel Chiltern upon her entrance by stating (amongst further description), "she is really like a Tanagra statuette, and would be rather annoyed if she were told so."

Under the pressure of collectors' demands in the late 19th century, Tanagra terracottas began to be faked.

Figurines

Purpose
The figures were posed in various ways to correspond to the life of the deceased. The figurines that were buried in the graves led to a theory that the small figures represented the person's possessions. They were believed by historians to bring comfort to the dead, sending them to the next world in peace as they took something from their old lives with them. It is speculated that though it was usual to place the figurines in the graves, it was not essential, as a vase would have been.

Subject matter
These figurines represented moments in everyday life, such as a woman taking care of her children, or a child playing, as well as men and young children sitting and women playing games with other women or by themselves. 
Seated women and girls
Women leaning against a column
Crouching woman
Pickaback
Men and young men
Eros
Aphrodite
Grotesques

Campaigns of excavation

Initial excavations
In 1806, Col. W.M. Leake visited the city of Tanagra and described the ruins that he had seen in detail in Travels in Northern Greece. Cambridge scholar Christopher Wordsworth visited the city in 1832, and in 1837, H.M. Ulrichs, a German scholar, visited the site. During 1852 the French General Staff published the initial map that revealed the location of the first six graves found in the ruins.

Grave robberies 
In 1870, an outbreak of grave robberies had occurred in the ruins of the city of Tanagra. This resulted in many of the tombs being ruined due to the robbers' carelessness in excavating the graves in order to steal the Tanagra figurines. Many of the graves had vases placed on them, but the majority of them ended up broken. During 1873, a number of illegal permits had been confiscated from people in nearby villages which would have allowed them to excavate the graves. This led the Archeological Society of Athens to protect the site and begin excavation before anything else could be stolen or destroyed.

Excavation of 1874–1879
The Archeological Society of Athens sent Panayotis Stamatakis, a senior official, to excavate the graves that had been left intact. Before he began, he confiscated antiquities from people in nearby villages. The grave robberies had led historians to excavate the city to learn more of its culture and history, and also to discover why the figurines were mainly found in graves, and what they might have represented for the deceased. The excavations would be on and off because of the possibility of damaging any art that might be left in the intact sites. Most of the Tanagra figurines were discovered to be buried with the dead. From the excavations a large number of figurines had been found among the ruins, but no details of the exact number of figurines were released. Many were missing or had been given away. While Stamatakis and the others sent from the Archeological Society of Athens would dig during the day, the people living near the ruins would dig during the night due to the lack of guards.

Notes

References
Besques-Mollard, Simone, 1950. Tanagra (Paris: Braun)
Tanagra - Myth and Archaeology Exhibition, Paris, 2003; Montreal, 2004. 
 Thompson, Dorothy (1966) " The origin of Tanagras". American Journal of Archaeology.70 (1): 51-63
 Bell, Malcolm III (2014) Morgatina Studies: The Terracotas. Princeton University Press.
 Dillon, Sheila (2010). The Female Portrait Statue in the Greek World. Cambridge University Press.
 Higgins Reynolds (1985). Tanagra and the Figurines. Princeton University Press.

Further reading
Minna Lönnqvist (1997) "Nulla signa sine argilla"  - Hellenistic Athens and the Message of the Tanagra Style, in Early Hellenistic Athens, Symptoms of a Change, ed. by Jaakko Frösén, Papers and Monographs of the Finnish Institute at Athens, Vol. VI, Vammala, 147-182+ 14 illustrations + sources.

External links

[http2://media-cache-ec0.pinimg.com/736x/bf/b0/94/bfb09455e2fcd4d2113aeae80165b741.jpg A charming figurine with well-preserved coat of paint] [http2://media-cache-ak0.pinimg.com/736x/a4/c5/45/a4c545d0c3ebc3b30942cd36167fb355.jpg alternate view of same] Hermitage Museum
Figurine with blue paint and gilt still visible Hermitage Museum
Figurine with Lyre Hermitage Museum
Tanagra figurines Metropolitan Museum
Lady with a Fan Altes Museum
Persephone with the pomegranate, Tanagra figurine with traces of white slip Louvre
Several Tanagra figures Louvre
Tanagra figurine with significant paint still visible Kunsthistorisches Museum Vienna
Antoine Zink and Elisa Porto, "Luminescence dating of the Tanagra terracottas of the Louvre collection", 2005. (pdf file)
Tanagra – L'histoire du Petit peuple d'argile

4th-century BC Greek sculptures
Ancient Greek pottery figurines
Figurines
Art of ancient Boeotia
Terracotta